Battenburg markings or Battenberg markings are a pattern of high-visibility markings developed in the United Kingdom in the 1990s and currently seen on many types of emergency service vehicles in the UK, Crown dependencies, British Overseas Territories and several other European countries such as the Czech Republic, Iceland, Sweden, Germany, Romania, Spain, Ireland, and Belgium as well as in New Zealand, Australia, Hong Kong, Trinidad and Tobago, and more recently, Canada. The name comes from its similarity in appearance to the cross-section of a Battenberg cake.

History

Battenburg markings were developed in the mid-1990s in the United Kingdom by the Police Scientific Development Branch (now the Home Office Centre for Applied Science and Technology) at the request of the national motorway policing sub-committee of the Association of Chief Police Officers. They were first developed for traffic patrol cars for United Kingdom police forces; private organisations and civil emergency services have also used them since then.

The primary objectives were to design markings that:
 Made officers and vehicles more conspicuous (e.g. to prevent collisions when stopped)
 Assisted in high-visibility policing for public reassurance and deterrence of traffic violations
 Made police vehicles nationally recognisable
 Were an equal-cost option compared to existing markings
 Were acceptable to at least 75% of the staff

Conspicuity

Battenburg design uses a regular pattern and the contrast between a light and a dark colour to increase conspicuity for the human eye.
The lighter colour is daylight-fluorescent (such as fluorescent-yellow) for better visibility in daytime, dusk and dawn. 
For night-time visibility, the complete pattern is retroreflective.

The Battenburg design typically has two rows of alternating rectangles, usually starting with yellow at the top corner, then the alternating colour, along the sides of a vehicle. Most cars use two block rows in the design (so-called full-Battenburg scheme). Some car designs use a single row (so-called half-Battenburg scheme) or one and a half rows.

Unless precautions are taken, pattern markings can have a camouflage effect, concealing a vehicle's outline, particularly in front of a cluttered background.
With Battenburg markings, this can be avoided by:
 Making rectangles large enough for optical resolution from distance—at least 600 × 300 mm. A typical car pattern consists of seven blocks along the vehicle side. (An odd number of blocks also allows both top corner blocks to be the same fluorescent colour.)
 Clearly marking cars' outlines in fluorescent colour along the roof pillars
 Avoiding designs with more than two block rows (even for higher vehicles) by including a large area of plain or daylight-fluorescent colour.
 Avoiding hybrid designs of Battenburg markings and other high-visibility patterns or check patterns.

The Battenburg livery is not used on the rear of vehicles; upward-facing chevrons of yellow and red are most commonly used there.

Sillitoe tartan

In the development of Battenburg markings, one of the key goals was to clearly identify vehicles associated with police. In this regard, the pattern was reminiscent of the Sillitoe tartan black-and-white or blue-and-white chequered markings first introduced by the City of Glasgow Police in the 1930s, which were subsequently adopted as a symbol of police services throughout the United Kingdom; they are also used by the Chicago Police Department, Australia, and New Zealand. (Although Sillitoe patterns identified vehicles associated with police and other emergency services, they were not highly visible.)

After the launch of Battenburg markings, police added retro-reflective Sillitoe tartan markings to their uniforms, usually in blue and white.

Safety
 
Battenburg side markings and chevron front-and-rear markings provide conspicuity for emergency vehicles, helping to reduce accidents, especially when they are in unusual traffic situations—e.g. stopped in fast-moving traffic, or moving at different speeds or in different directions.

Several criticisms of the Battenburg scheme were stated at the 3rd Annual US Emergency Medical Services (EMS) Safety Summit in October 2010 about their use on ambulances, including:
 The difficulty of applying them to small, curved, and oddly-shaped surfaces
 The high costs of adopting the markings
 The confusing pattern caused when several parked Battenburg vehicles visually overlap
 Obscuring the vehicle's shapes against complex backgrounds, or with open doors and hatches
 Combinations other than police yellow-and-blue being less effective, and sometimes even making emergency personnel harder to see
 Confronting the public with unfamiliar markings

The pattern's use by services other than UK police, and in other countries, was also criticised.

The high-visibility chevrons often used on the rear and front of Battenburg-marked vehicles, "through popular opinion rather than by a scientific process of testing and research", were found ineffective at reducing rear-end collisions. Stationary vehicles on high-speed roads were likely to be noticed, but not the fact that they were stopped. Parking at an angle was found a far more effective way of indicating the vehicles were stopped.

Usage by country

Australia 

In Western Australia, St John Ambulance Western Australia uses green-and-yellow markings, while New South Wales Ambulance uses red-and-white Battenburg markings on ambulances and patient transport vehicles. Australian police utilise the similar Sillitoe tartan markings.

Belgium 

In response to the terrorist attacks on 13 November 2015 in Paris and 22 March 2016 in Brussels, the Belgian federal government conducted an analysis on the functioning of the emergency services during terrorist attacks. The main issue identified regarding the emergency medical services was that their recognizability (of both vehicles and personnel) had to improve, so that emergency workers would be able to identify qualified medical providers more quickly during an intervention.

An agreement was made between the federal government and the communities and regions to implement the same new vehicle markings and uniforms. Specifically, emergency ambulances and response vehicles would keep the yellow base colour, whilst non-emergency ambulances would get a white base colour. Both types of vehicles would be marked with retroreflective yellow-and-green Battenburg markings, similar to British ambulances.

A new uniform for medical personnel was also introduced, with different colours for the Star of Life for the different types of workers.

Aside from medical vehicles, some new fire brigade, Civil Protection and highway services vehicles also use respectively yellow-and-red, blue-and-orange and yellow-and-black Battenburg markings.

Canada 

In Canada, Battenburg markings on law enforcement vehicles are uncommon. However, in recent decades, Canada has slowly integrated some Battenburg markings on EMS vehicles, particularly in Ontario and Quebec.

Battenburg markings are used on plow trucks for transportation and infrastructure in some parts of Canada, primarily on the back to increase visibility and alert people driving on a highway during poor road conditions that there is a plow truck in use and they must slow down. The general colour scheme for a snowplow's rear reflective panel is yellow-green and black.

Ontario 
The parts of Ontario that utilize Battenburg markings, which are generally used by EMS vehicles, include the Region of Niagara, Greater Sudbury, Peterborough, Lanark County, and Frontenac County.

Battenburg markings on police vehicles are not a common sight. The first regional police service to ever officially use Battenburg markings on its vehicles was the St. Thomas Police Service when it tested its new police interceptors with Battenburg markings, which were inspired by the UK's Battenburg design with the familiar blue and yellow reflective markings, in order to help enhance visibility within the city.

The Barrie Police Service later took a similar approach to redesigning its vehicle wraps, which was announced on July 26, 2022, when it unveiled a half-Battenburg marked police cruiser as part of a pilot project to evaluate its visibility within the community. This design featured the same blue and yellow reflective markings as those seen in the UK and Europe.

Quebec 
In Quebec, Battenburg-style markings are used on various EMS vehicles, though some of the markings are reminiscent of Sillitoe tartan.

Hong Kong

Hong Kong was a British Dependent Territory until 1997. Some emergency vehicles and special vehicles in the Hong Kong Police Force, Hong Kong Fire Services Department, Auxiliary Medical Service, and Hong Kong St. John Ambulance use Battenburg markings.

Czech Republic 
All Czech emergency vehicles, such as ambulances, use yellow-and-green Batternburg markings.

Denmark 

Danish emergency vehicles can have one of two options: a series of diagonal lines, or a Battenburg pattern. The diagonal lines must be either red-and-white or red-and-yellow at an angle of 45° ± 5° and have a width of 100 mm ± 2,5 mm. In the front and rear of the vehicle, the markings must be made symmetrical in a way that traffic is lead around the vehicle.

Vehicles may have a reflective text in the above colours, describing their function; for example "POLITI" (Police), "ALARM 112", "AMBULANCE", "LÆGEVAGT" (Doctor), "INDSATSLEDER" (Incident Commander) or similar text.

The above patterns are not obligatory. For example the Danish Emergency Management Agency have chosen to simply not have any reflective marking on their vehicles.

Germany 

All rescue vehicles in Bavaria which have been procured uniformly since 2017 have a foiling in the Battenburg marker. From 2019 the ambulance service in Schleswig-Holstein started to adapt the design.

Iceland

In 2018 the Icelandic police started marking new police cars with blue and neon yellow markings similar to Battenburg markings used in Europe. Since then the police cars in the capital region have been made even more visible. In 2020 were Icelandic ambulances changed to look more like ambulances in Europe, adopting yellow and green markings. Icelandic Search and Rescue started adopting Battenburg markings in 2016 with red and yellow markings similar to the fire services.

Ireland

	

In Ireland, the majority of the emergency services have adopted the Battenburg style of markings.

New Zealand

The New Zealand Police use yellow-and-blue Battenburg markings on some vehicles. Until October 2008 general duties vehicles were marked in orange and blue, with yellow and blue for highway patrol units; orange and blue was phased out in 2014. Vehicles of New Zealand's St John's Ambulance Service/ Wellington Free Ambulance are marked with green-and-yellow Battenburg markings or rows of green-and-yellow half-chevrons. On 1 July 2017, New Zealand's urban and rural firefighting organisations amalgamated into Fire and Emergency New Zealand, with a new brand including Battenburg markings to be rolled out to the fleet.

Sweden

Originally Swedish Police vehicles were painted with black roofs and doors or black roofs, bonnet, and boot. During the 1980s the cars became white with the word "Polis" written on the side in a semi-futuristic typeface. Later the livery became simply blue and white. In 2005 they began using a light blue and fluorescent yellow Battenburg livery. Swedish police cars have been Saabs, Volvos or Volkswagens, with the same livery all over Sweden. Many Swedish road agencies, contractors and consultants use Battenburg markings on road maintenance vehicles, with an orange-and-blue colour scheme, as in the UK rail response type shown above. This practice was established after a study in 2008 by the Swedish Road Administration, which showed a significant traffic calming effect when using orange-and-blue Battenburg marking to improve the visibility of road maintenance vehicles.

Switzerland

The first Swiss ambulance service with Battenburg markings was the emergency medical services in Zofingen. Since 2008, they have used Battenburg markings on their Volkswagen Crafters and Mercedes-Benz Sprinters. They use white-and-red markings on their ALS units.

Another Swiss service with Battenburg markings is the Swiss Border Guard agency, which uses yellow block markings on its vehicles.

United Kingdom

In the United Kingdom, the majority of the emergency services have adopted the Battenburg style of markings; nearly half of all police forces adopted the markings within three years of their introduction, and over three quarters were using it by 2003.

In 2004, following the widespread adoption and recognition of the Battenburg markings on police vehicles, the Home Office recommended that all police vehicles, not just those on traffic duty, use "half-Battenburg" livery, formalising the practice of a number of forces.

In the United Kingdom each emergency service has been allocated a specified darker colour in addition to yellow, with the police continuing to use blue, ambulances using green, and the fire service their traditional red. Other government agencies such as immigration enforcement have adopted a variation, without using the reflective yellow.

The use of these colours in retro-reflective material is controlled by the Road Vehicle Lighting Regulations 1989, with vehicles only legally allowed the use of amber reflective material (and red near the rear of the vehicle), A number of civilian organisations have also adopted the pattern, which is not legally protected, and a number of these also use other reflective colours.

An alternative to the use of reflective materials is the use of fluorescent or other non-reflective markings, which may be used by any vehicle.

United States

Battenburg markings on emergency vehicles are uncommon in the United States. However, many municipalities have begun to use the markings in recent years.

The Miami Township Police Department in Ohio has previously used ones similar to those found in the UK on their police cars. Battenburg markings are also used in South Carolina's Charleston County for EMS vehicles.

From 2017 to 2021, the Pittsburgh Police used Sillitoe tartan markings on some of their fleets. The design was updated to include black-and-gold Battenburg markings in 2021 to represent the city's official colours. City authorities stated that the markings would also be applied to all future municipal vehicles.

The Chicago Police Department began using Sillitoe tartan markings on their police vehicles in 2018, while the hats of officers have used them since 1967.

See also
 Sillitoe tartan
 Aerial roof markings
 Blues and twos
 Panda car
 Jam sandwich (police car)

References

External links

High Conspicuity Livery for Police Cars 14-04
High Conspicuity Livery for Police Motorcycles 47-06

Emergency vehicles
Vehicle markings
Visibility
British inventions